Karen Nelson Moore (born November 19, 1948) is an American attorney and jurist serving as a United States circuit judge of the United States Court of Appeals for the Sixth Circuit. Her chambers are in Cleveland, Ohio.

Education

Moore received her Artium Baccalaureus from Radcliffe College of Harvard University in 1970, graduating Phi Beta Kappa and magna cum laude, and her Juris Doctor from Harvard Law School, also magna cum laude, in 1973.

Career 
Moore clerked for Judge Malcolm Richard Wilkey of the United States Court of Appeals for the District of Columbia Circuit from 1973 to 1974 and for Justice Harry Blackmun of the United States Supreme Court from 1974 to 1975.

Moore was an instructor for the International Tax Law Program at Harvard Law School from 1972 to 1973. She was in private practice in Cleveland from 1975 to 1977 and served on the faculty of Case Western Reserve University Law School from 1977 to 1995. Moore was a visiting professor at Harvard Law School from 1990 to 1991, and served as the president of Harvard's Board of Overseers for 2015-16.

Moore was nominated by President Bill Clinton on January 24, 1995, to a seat on the United States Court of Appeals for the Sixth Circuit vacated by Judge Robert B. Krupansky. She was confirmed by the United States Senate in a voice vote on March 24, 1995, and received her commission on March 29, 1995.

See also
List of law clerks of the Supreme Court of the United States (Seat 2)

References

Sources

1948 births
Case Western Reserve University faculty
Judges of the United States Court of Appeals for the Sixth Circuit
Harvard Law School alumni
Harvard Law School faculty
Law clerks of the Supreme Court of the United States
Living people
People from Washington, D.C.
Radcliffe College alumni
United States court of appeals judges appointed by Bill Clinton
American women legal scholars
20th-century American judges
20th-century American women judges
21st-century American women judges
21st-century American judges